Buenaventura is one of the 67 municipalities of Chihuahua, in northern Mexico. The municipal seat lies at San Buenaventura. The municipality covers an area of 8,938.3 km².

As of 2010, the municipality had a total population of 22,378, up from 20,533 as of 2005. 

The municipality had 237 localities, the largest of which (with 2010 populations in parentheses) were: San Buenaventura (6,957), Ejido Benito Juárez (5,778), Constitución (2,709), Flores Magón (2,510), classified as urban, and Rodrigo M. Quevedo (1,367), classified as rural.

Geography

Towns and villages

References

 

Municipalities of Chihuahua (state)